The Little Trout River is a tributary of the Trout River, flowing in Adirondack Park, in Franklin County, New York, in New York State, in United States.

This valley is mainly served in New York, the nearby road is Constable Street and State Highway 30.

The river surface is generally frozen from mid-December to the end of March. Safe circulation on the ice is generally done from the end of December to the beginning of March. The water level of the river varies with the seasons and the precipitation.

Geography 

The small Trout River rises at the mouth of a small lake located between Soulia Mountain and Baldy Mountain in the Adirondack Mountains, in Adirondack Park.

From its source in Adirondack Park, the Little Trout River descends , according to the following segments:

  towards the west in a deep valley, crossing a zone of marsh by bending towards the north in order to circumvent the Soulia Mountain, until a stream (coming from the east);
  north-west in a generally deep valley, to the village bridge of Burke;
  north-west in a generally deep valley, to the outlet of Alder Brook;
  first towards the west, curving towards the northwest forming a few loops at the end of the segment, until its mouth.

See also 

 Adirondack Park,
 Franklin County, New York
 New York State
 Trout River
 Châteauguay River, a stream
 List of rivers of New York

References 

Rivers of New York (state)
Rivers of Franklin County, New York